Christopher Kelly (born September 7, 1983) is an American comedian, writer, and director known for his work on Saturday Night Live, and writing and directing the autobiographical film Other People that premiered at the 2016 Sundance Film Festival. He has received five Emmy Award nominations for his work on SNL.

Career

Early career
Kelly grew up in Sacramento, California, the son of Joanne née Kellogg (1960–2009) Kelly. He has a sister, Janelle, and a half sister, Katie, from his mother's remarriage. He attended and graduated from Sheldon High School. He attended college at UC Irvine. He was a staff writer and director at Funny or Die and Onion News Network, the latter of which won the 2009 Peabody Award. He was also Head Writer for Matt Besser's Comedy Central special This Show Will Get You High in 2010. Kelly also performed at UCBNY with his storytelling show Chris Kelly: America's Princess Diana, and before that, wrote, directed and starred in the play Oh My God, I Heard You're Dying! He was on various Maude Teams as both a writer and actor, including Stone Cold Fox, 27 Kidneys, and Thunder Gulch, and was a frequent monologist at ASSSSCAT in both NYC and LA.

Saturday Night Live
Kelly was a supervising writer for Saturday Night Live having joined the show as a staff writer for the 37th season and promoted to supervising writer on the 40th season. Along with his SNL writing partner, Sarah Schneider, Kelly has created many sketches including: "(Do It On My) Twin Bed," "Back Home Ballers," "The Beygency" (about Beyoncé), and "First Got Horny 2 U." He and Schneider primarily wrote for Aidy Bryant and Kate McKinnon, including "Dyke and Fats."  Kelly has been nominated for five Primetime Emmy Awards for his work on SNL.

In August 2016, it was announced that Kelly and Schneider would be co-head writers for SNLs 42nd season.  Kelly was the first openly gay head writer of SNL. Both Kelly and Schneider left SNL after the completion of the 42nd season.

Broad City
Kelly is also a writer and consulting producer on Comedy Central's Broad City, which earned him a nomination for the Writers Guild of America Award for Television: Comedy Series. He was a self described fan of the Broad City web series and joined the show as a writer and consulting producer when it was picked up as a series on Comedy Central.

The Other Two

Along with SNL co-headwriter Schneider, Kelly is the creator and executive producer (along with Lorne Michaels) of The Other Two, which premiered on January 24, 2019 on Comedy Central.  The show stars Drew Tarver, Heléne Yorke, Molly Shannon, Ken Marino, and Case Walker.

Film
Kelly wrote and directed his first feature film, Other People, that premiered at the 2016 Sundance Film Festival in the opening slot. The film is about a struggling comedy writer (played by Jesse Plemons), who has just broken up with his boyfriend and moves from New York City to Sacramento to help his sick mother (played by Molly Shannon). He has to live with his conservative father and younger sisters for the first time in many years and feels like a stranger in his childhood home. As his mother's health deteriorates, David tries to extract meaning from the awful experience and convince everyone that he's doing okay. The film is loosely based on his own life drawing from his experience of losing his mother to cancer in 2009. He was labeled one of the "13 Hot Directors to Watch" at Sundance in 2016.

Personal life
In 2015, Kelly lived in Los Angeles with his boyfriend and their dog Jill.

Awards and nominations
Kelly received the following awards and nominations:

Peabody Award
2009 Peabody Award - Onion News Network (won)

Primetime Emmy Award
2012 Primetime Emmy Award for Outstanding Writing for a Variety Series - Saturday Night Live (nominated)
2013 Primetime Emmy Award for Outstanding Writing for a Variety Series - Saturday Night Live (nominated)
2014 Primetime Emmy Award for Outstanding Writing for a Variety Series - Saturday Night Live (nominated)
2015 Primetime Emmy Award for Outstanding Writing for a Variety Series - Saturday Night Live (nominated)
2015 Primetime Emmy Award for Outstanding Variety, Music, or Comedy Special - Saturday Night Live 40th Anniversary Special (nominated)

Writers Guild of America Award
2012 Writers Guild of America Award for Television: Comedy/Variety (Including Talk) - Series - Saturday Night Live (nominated)
2013 Writers Guild of America Award for Television: Comedy/Variety (Including Talk) - Series - Saturday Night Live (nominated)
2014 Writers Guild of America Award for Television: Comedy/Variety (Including Talk) - Series - Saturday Night Live (nominated)
2015 Writers Guild of America Award for Television: Comedy/Variety (Including Talk) - Series - Saturday Night Live (nominated)
2015 Writers Guild of America Award for Television: Comedy Series - Broad City (nominated)

References

External links

University of California, Irvine alumni
Living people
American television writers
American comedy writers
American male screenwriters
American gay writers
American LGBT screenwriters
Writers from New York City
Peabody Award winners
Place of birth missing (living people)
LGBT film directors
1983 births
Upright Citizens Brigade Theater performers
Screenwriters from New York (state)
Screenwriters from California
Comedians from California
21st-century American comedians
American male television writers
21st-century American screenwriters
21st-century American male writers
21st-century LGBT people